Peggy Miley  is an American actress and writer. She has played supporting roles in films such as Alice, The Little Princess, Bandits, The Back-up Plan, and Primary Colors. She played Doris Driscoll in the Netflix series Stranger Things. She is also known for her work in commercials, including a Christmas television ad for Cheerios in which she played the grandmother.

Personal life
Miley graduated from St. Jean Baptiste High School in 1959 where she was involved with theatre, and from St. John's University with a degree in literature in 1963. In 1975 she completed a master's degree in Humanities at NYU.

Television
Miley has guest starred on several television series including Becker, Boy Meets World, Liv and Maddie, NYPD Blue, Big Love, Monk, Mike & Molly and Six Feet Under. She played a supporting role in the 1998 television movie Winchell.

Filmography

Film

Television

References

External links
 

20th-century American actresses
21st-century American actresses
American film actresses
American stage actresses
American television actresses
Living people
1941 births